State Route 238 (SR 238) is a north–south secondary state highway located entirely in Montgomery County in Middle Tennessee.

Route description 
SR 238 begins at a junction with SR 76 in Port Royal. It goes north to pass through the community and Port Royal State Park, where it crosses a bridge over the Red River. SR 238 then continues north through farmland and has an intersection with SR 237 before coming to an end at the Kentucky state line, becoming Kentucky Route 2128 (KY 2128) just south of US 79 west of Guthrie.

Major intersections

References 

238
238